War studies, sometimes called polemology, is the multi-disciplinary study of war. It pertains to the military, diplomatic, philosophical, social, political, psychological or economic dimensions of human conflict. The word polemology derives from  + "-logy".

History 

In 1943, King's College London reestablished its military science department as the Department of War Studies. The department was discontinued in 1948, and the field of war studies was taught in the Department of Medieval and Modern History until the Department of War Studies was reinstated in 1962.

Disciplines
Laws of war
Philosophy of war
Ethics of war
Just war theory
Deterrence theory
Psychology of war
Post traumatic stress disorder
Psychological operations
Military history
Military science
Motivations, conduct and effect of war
Economics of war
Sociology of war
Sociology of the military
International relations
International relations theory
Political science
Anthropology

See also

International humanitarian law
Peace and conflict studies
Security studies
Strategic studies
Military science

References 

Social sciences